Marcella is an unincorporated community located in Holmes County, Mississippi near the Yazoo River.

Marcella is named for the Marcella plantation.

A post office operated under the name Marcella from 1881 to 1894.

Marion Post Wolcott documented people and scenes from the Marcella plantation in October 1939 as part of her work with the Farm Security Administration.

References

Unincorporated communities in Holmes County, Mississippi
Unincorporated communities in Mississippi